Mahvelat-e Shomali Rural District is a rural district (dehestan) in Shadmehr District, Mahvelat County, Razavi Khorasan province, Iran. At the 2006 census, its population was 4,424, in 1,214 families. The rural district has 6 villages. The capital of the rural district is the village of Dughabad.

References 

Rural Districts of Razavi Khorasan Province
Mahvelat County